Goward may refer to:

Geography
 Goward Peak, Palmer Land, Antarctica
 Temagami North, Ontario, Canada, an unincorporated community formerly called Goward
 Goward Dolmen, Northern Ireland, a dolmen (megalithic tomb)

People
 Ernest Goward (1896–1961), Indian cricketer
 Frank Kenneth Goward (1919–1954), English physicist
 Mary Anne Keeley (1805–1899), née Goward, English actress and actor-manager
 Pru Goward (born 1952), Australian politician
 Russell Goward (1935–2007), American politician
 Ryan Goward (born 1989), English footballer